Todds Valley is a small township to the north of Nelson, New Zealand.

Demographics
Todds Valley is part of the Nelson Rural statistical area.

References

Populated places in the Nelson Region